VCP may refer to:

Places 
Van Cortlandt Park, New York City
 Viracopos International Airport (IATA: VCP), near São Paulo, Brazil

Organizations 
Communist Party of Vietnam, also known as Vietnamese Communist Party
Verband Christlicher Pfadfinderinnen und Pfadfinder, a German Scouting association
United Communist Party (Netherlands) (Verenigde Communistische Partij), a communist party in the Netherlands
Victorian College of Pharmacy, at Monash University, Parkville, Victoria, Australia
Vienna Capital Partners, an independent corporate finance advisor and private equity investor
Votorantim Celulose e Papel, a former Brazilian manufacturer of paper products

Science and technology 
Valosin-containing protein, an ATPase enzyme
Verville VCP, a 1920 prototype US Army Air Corps fighter plane
Very Coarse Pottery, another name for briquetage
Videocassette player, a device which can play but not record videocassettes
Vitrified clay pipe, a pipe widely used in sewers
Volume coverage pattern, a scan strategy for NEXRAD weather radar
Viral citrullinated peptides, a target of anti–citrullinated protein antibody in rheumatoid arthritis
 virtual control panel (MCCS) — monitor control protocol

Other uses 
Veuve Clicquot Ponsardin, a French champagne producer
Vinos de Calidad Preferente wine classification system of Uruguay